Zu Warriors from the Magic Mountain is a 1983 Hong Kong supernatural wuxia fantasy film directed by Tsui Hark and based on the xianxia novel Legend of the Swordsmen of the Mountains of Shu by Huanzhulouzhu. The film has been noted for combining elements of Hong Kong action cinema with special effects technology provided by a team of Western artists including Robert Blalack. It served as an influence for the 1986 American film Big Trouble in Little China.

Zu Warriors from the Magic Mountain received five nominations at the 3rd Hong Kong Film Awards: Best Action Choreography for Corey Yuen, Best Actress for Brigitte Lin, Best Art Direction for William Chang, Best Film Editing for Peter Cheung, and Best Picture.

Premise
During the Sixteen Kingdoms period,  army deserter Dik Ming-kei, who was chased by vampires in the mountain of Zu, is rescued by Master Ding Yan and becomes his pupil. When they were ambushed by the Blood Devil, devil chaser Siu Yu and his pupil Yat Jan came to their assistance. They managed to hold off the Blood Devil but they need to find the Dual Swords to destroy it.

Master Ding took the wounded Siu Yu to Celestial Fort and sought help from the Mistress, but was in turned poisoned by the Blood Devil and he surrendered to the Dark Force. Will Ming-kei and Yat Jan find the Dual Swords and destroy the Blood Devil?

Cast
 Sammo Hung as Chang Mei, a Red Army soldier
 Yuen Biao as Di Ming-qi / Dik Ming-kei
 Adam Cheng as Ding Yin / Ding Yan
 Brigitte Lin as the Ice Queen
 Moon Lee as one of the Ice Queen's guards
 Judy Ongg as Lady Li I-chi
 Corey Yuen as Devil Disciple Leader
 Damian Lau as Xiao Ru / Siu Yu
 Mang Hoi as Yi Zhen / Yat Jan
 Norman Chui as the Heaven's Blade
 Chung Fat as a Blue Army Commander
 Dick Wei as a Blue Army Commander
 Ha Kwong-li as Ji Wu-shuang / Chi Wu-chuang
 Ka Lee as an Orange Army soldier
 Fung Hak-on as a Devil Disciple leader
 Yuen Miu as an Orange Army soldier
 Sai Gwa-Pau as the boatman
 Tsui Hark as a Blue Army soldier
 Jørn Bertram as the Doctor

Reception and influence
In a 1991 Fangoria article by Tim Paxton and Dave Todarello, Zu Warriors from the Magic Mountain is referred to as "a film which freely intertwines Chinese myth and lore with Hollywood special FX and comic-book action. It's the proverbial rollercoaster of kung fu, magic, monsters, humor, tension, visual spectacle and gruesome bits."

Craig Lines of Den of Geek wrote that Zu Warriors from the Magic Mountain "was a significant film for the Hong Kong 'New Wave' movement that revolutionized the industry in the late '70s", characterized by "young filmmakers [who] broke free from the traditional studio system to create weird, energetic and experimental movies". Lines praised the actors' performances and the martial arts choreography, and noted the film's "warm, full-hearted message of kindness and acceptance".

American filmmaker John Carpenter has stated that Zu Warriors from the Magic Mountain was an influence on his 1986 film Big Trouble in Little China.

Home media
The U.K. release of the DVD by Hong Kong Legends features an audio commentary with Tsui Hark and film critic Bey Logan.

The Hong Kong release of the DVD by Fortune Star Media features the Cantonese version of the film's trailer, as well as an interview with actor Yuen Biao.

References

External links
 
 
 
 
 

1983 films
1983 action films
1983 martial arts films
1980s fantasy adventure films
1980s supernatural films
Hong Kong New Wave films
Hong Kong action films
Hong Kong martial arts films
Hong Kong fantasy films
Wuxia films
Martial arts fantasy films
Films directed by Tsui Hark
Films set in Sichuan
Films set in the Jin dynasty (266–420)
Sixteen Kingdoms in fiction
1980s Hong Kong films